The Welfare Benefits Up-rating Act 2013 is an Act of Parliament in the United Kingdom which places a limit on a range of Welfare benefits in the United Kingdom. It introduces a cap on most working-age benefits, limiting rises to 1% for three years from April 2014, unaffected by inflation. It was enacted by the Parliament of the United Kingdom on 26 March 2013. It aims to reduce welfare spending.

External links
Welfare Benefits Up-rating Act 2013 on Parliament.uk

References

United Kingdom Acts of Parliament 2013
Social security in the United Kingdom